Lady Eve may refer to:

Fanny Jean Turing, Lady Trustram Eve (1864 – 1934), British politician 
Lady Eve, a minor DC Comics character
The Lady Eve, a 1941 comedy film by Preston Sturges